Streptomyces dangxiongensis is a bacterium species from the genus of Streptomyces which has been isolated from soil from the Qinghai-Tibet Plateau in China.

See also 
 List of Streptomyces species

References 

dangxiongensis
Bacteria described in 2019